A special election to determine the member of the United States House of Representatives for Georgia's 6th congressional district was held on April 18, 2017, with a runoff held two months later on June 20. Republican Karen Handel narrowly defeated Democrat Jon Ossoff in the runoff vote, 51.8% to 48.2%. Handel succeeded Tom Price, who resigned from the seat following his confirmation as United States Secretary of Health and Human Services in the Trump Administration. The runoff election was necessary when no individual candidate earned the majority of votes in the election on April 18. Ossoff received 48.1% of the vote in the first round, followed by Handel with 19.8%.

Georgia's state law requires the Governor of Georgia to call for a special election to be held at least 30 days after a vacancy. Following Price's resignation, Governor Nathan Deal called for the special election to be held on April 18, with a filing window for prospective candidates from February 13 to 15, 2017. All candidates ran on one ballot, with a runoff election scheduled for the first- and second-place finishers, if no candidate received 50% of the vote. Neither Ossoff nor Handel received a majority, and despite the Democratic Ossoff's finishing nearly 30 points ahead in the first round, Republican Handel nonetheless prevailed in the runoff election, though she would ultimately lose reelection in 2018 to Democrat Lucy McBath. Ossoff would later go on to be elected a United States Senator, defeating incumbent David Perdue in the 2021 runoff election, becoming the first Jewish senator from Georgia, the first millennial elected to the Senate, and the youngest Democratic Senator elected since Joe Biden in 1972.

The election attracted exceptional national interest, with both major parties perceiving it as an opportunity to shape the political narrative prior to the 2018 midterm elections. The district has a history of favoring GOP House candidates by large margins, but Trump won it by just 1% in 2016, making Democrats hopeful to win a normally strong GOP district. A total of $50 million was spent as of the close of early-voting period on June 17, making it the most expensive House election in history. Of that, more than $40 million was spent on television and radio advertising alone, smashing past House election records. A very high number of voters—140,000—cast ballots during the runoff-election early-voting period.

Candidates

Republican Party

Declared 
David Abroms, businessman
Mohammad Ali Bhuiyan, economist
 Keith Grawert, former USAF pilot
Bob Gray, businessman and Johns Creek City councilman
Karen Handel, former Secretary of State of Georgia, candidate for Governor in 2010, and candidate for the U.S. Senate in 2014
Judson Hill, former State Senator
Bruce LeVell, businessman
Amy Kremer, tea party activist
 William Llop, certified public accountant and candidate for GA-11 in 2012 and 2016
Dan Moody, former state senator
 Kurt Wilson, businessman

Withdrew 
Donnie Bolena, candidate for Mayor of Sandy Springs in 2009
 S.M. Abu Zahed, aviation engineer

Declined 
John Albers, state senator
Brandon Beach, state senator
 John Isakson Jr., real estate developer and son of U.S. Senator Johnny Isakson
Cade Joiner, small business owner
Jan Jones, State Representative
Chuck Martin, state representative
Rusty Paul, Mayor of Sandy Springs, former state senator and former chairman of the Georgia Republican Party
Betty Price, state representative and wife of Tom Price
Kelly Stewart, former Johns Creek City councilwoman

Democratic Party

Declared 
Ragin Edwards, sales senior manager
Richard Keatley, college professor and former officer in the Navy
Jon Ossoff, filmmaker, media executive, investigative journalist, former congressional aide
Rebecca Quigg, physician
Ron Slotin, former state senator and candidate for GA-04 in 1996

Withdrew 
Sally Harrell, former state representative (endorsed Jon Ossoff)
 Josh McLaurin, attorney (endorsed Jon Ossoff)

Declined 
Taylor Bennett, former state representative
Scott Holcomb, state representative
Rob Teilhet, former state representative and candidate for attorney general in 2010

Libertarian Party

Declined 
Chase Oliver

Independent

Declared 
 Alexander Hernandez
 Andre Pollard, computer systems engineer

Withdrew 
 Joseph Pond, plumber

Special election

Predictions

Endorsements

Polling

Results

Runoff 

On April 18, 2017, no candidate received 50% of the vote in the blanket primary ("jungle primary"). Ossoff led with about 48.1% of the vote, Republican candidate Karen Handel received 19.8%, and the remainder of votes were scattered for 16 other candidates. Because no candidate secured an absolute majority, the top two-vote-getters, Ossoff and Handel, competed in a runoff election on June 20, 2017. Ossoff won all but 1% of the Democratic vote, while the Republican vote was more heavily split. Republicans collectively won 51.2% of the overall vote.

Ossoff broke national fundraising records for a U.S. House candidate. In total, Ossoff's campaign raised more than $23 million, two-thirds of which was contributed by small-dollar donors nationwide. Ossoff's opponent, Karen Handel, and national Republican groups attacked Ossoff for raising significant small-dollar contributions from outside of Georgia, although Handel's campaign received the bulk of its support from super PACs and other outside groups, including those funded anonymously by so-called "dark money". Combined spending by the campaigns and outside groups on their behalf added up to over $55 million, which was the most expensive House Congressional election in U.S. history. During the campaign, Republican strategy focused on connecting Ossoff to House Democratic Leader Nancy Pelosi, a polarizing and unpopular figure; Ossoff declined to say whether he would, if elected, support Pelosi for Speaker of the House.

Predictions

Endorsements

Debates
Complete video of first debate, June 8, 2017.

Polling

Averages

Polls 

with Bob Gray

with Judson Hill

with Dan Moody

Results

On June 20, 2017, Ossoff was defeated by Handel, 51.87% to 48.13%. Following reports of the election results, The New York Times characterized the race as "demoralizing for Democrats". This was as close as a Democrat had come to winning this district since it assumed its current configuration as a northern suburban district in 1992; previously, Democratic challengers had only won more than 40 percent of the vote twice. Handel later lost re-election to a full term on November 6, 2018, to Democratic challenger Lucy McBath, making her the first Democrat to represent the district in its present form. Ossoff would later run for Senate in 2020–21 where he would successfully unseat then-incumbent Republican David Perdue.

County results

See also 
List of special elections to the United States House of Representatives
2016 United States House of Representatives elections in Georgia

References

External links 
Campaign websites
Karen Handel (R) for Congress
Jon Ossoff (D) for Congress

Georgia 2017 06
Georgia 2017 06
2017 06 Special
Georgia 06 Special
United States House of Representatives 06 Special
United States House of Representatives 2017 06
April 2017 events in the United States
June 2017 events in the United States